The 2019–20 Curaçao Promé Divishon is the 94th season of the Curaçao Promé Divishon, the top division football competition in Curaçao. The season began on 10 November 2019. The season was postponed on 14 March due to the COVID-19 pandemic and returned on 29 June 2020.

Regular season

Kaya 6
After the 18th round, in which every team has played the other nine, home and away, the top six teams advanced to the Kaya 6. Teams will play a round-robin for a total of five rounds, which will take place from 14 August to 12 September. The top four teams at the end of the Kaya 6 will advance to the Kaya 4.

Kaya 4
Following the Kaya 6, the top four teams advance to the Kaya 4 and will play a round-robin for a total of three rounds, taking place from 16 October to 28 October. The top two teams will advance to the championship final.

Championship final

Clubs' stadiums

References

External links
Federashon Futbòl Kòrsou

Curaçao Sekshon Pagá seasons
1
Curacao